Zamia disodon is a species of plant in the family Zamiaceae. It is found in Colombia and Peru. It is threatened by habitat loss.

References

disodon
Critically endangered plants
Flora of Colombia
Flora of Peru
Plants described in 2001
Taxonomy articles created by Polbot